Kaathirunna Divasom is a 1983 Indian Malayalam film, directed by P. K. Joseph and produced by Polson Cheranellor. The film stars M. G. Soman, Nellikode Bhaskaran, Cochin Haneefa and Jagathy Sreekumar in the lead roles. The film has musical score by P. S. Divakar.

Cast
Cochin Haneefa
M. G. Soman as Ravi
Jagathy Sreekumar as Narayanan
Nellikode Bhaskaran as Station Master
Jayamalini
Sreelatha Namboothiri as Malini's mother
P. K. Radhadevi
Mini as Malini
Vanchiyoor Radha
Nagesh
Aroor Sathyan

Soundtrack
The music was composed by P. S. Divakar and the lyrics were written by T. Thankappan and Poovachal Khader.

References

External links
 

1983 films
1980s Malayalam-language films